Younghi Pagh-Paan (born 1945) is a South Korean composer.

Life
Pagh‑Paan was born in Cheongju, Chungcheongbuk-do, South Korea. She studied music at the Seoul National University from 1965 to 1971. In 1974 she received a DAAD scholarship to study in Germany and entered the Freiburg Musikhochschule, where she studied composition with Klaus Huber, analysis with Brian Ferneyhough, music theory with Peter Förtig and piano with Edith Picht-Axenfeld.

After completing her studies, she took guest professorships at Graz in 1991 and Karlsruhe in 1992–93. In 1994 she became a professor of composition at the University of the Arts Bremen. She founded and serves as director of Atelier Neue Musik.

She was one of the top 10 performed composers on the Internationalen Ferienkurse für Neue Musik between 1946 and 2014.

Honors and awards
1978 1st Prize at the 5th Composers Seminar in Boswil (Switzerland)
1979 1st Prize at the International Rostrum of Composers (Unesco, Pads)
1979 Nan‑Pa Music Prize, Korea
1980 1st Prize of the City of Stuttgart
1980/1981 Scholarship at the Südwestfunk's Heinrich‑Strobel-Stiftung
1985 Scholarship from the Kunststiftung of Baden-Württemberg
1995 Heidelberg Artists Prize
2006 Lifetime Achievement Award of Seoul National University
2007 Order of Civil Merit of the Republic of Korea (South Korea)
2009 15th KBS Global Korean Award
2009 Member of the Akademie der Künste, Berlin
2020 Berliner Kunstpreis

Works
Her works include:

1971 PA-MUN
1975 Dreisam-Nore
1977 Man-Nam I
1977/86 MAN-NAM II
1977/2005 Man-Nam III
1979 NUN
1979 Sori
1981 Madi
1982 PYON-KYONG
1983 Flammenzeichen (Sign of the Flames)
1984 AA-GA I
1984/85 NO-UL
1985 'HIN-NUN I
1986/87 NIM
1987/88 TA-RYONG II
1988/89 HWANG-TO / Yellow Earth
1988/98 TA-RYONG VI
1989–1998 HWANG-TO II
1990  ma-am (Mein Herz)
1990/91 MA-UM
1991 TA-RYONG IV
1991 TSI-SHIN / TA-RYONG III
1991 Mein Herz
1992 U-MUL / The Well
1992/94 Rast in einem alten Kloster
1992/1993 BIDAN-SIL / Silk Thread
1993 HANG-SANG I
1993/94 TSI-SHIN-KUT / The Ritual of the Earth Spirit
1994 HANG-SANG II
1995 TA-RYONG V
1995/96 SOWON / The Wish
1996 NE MA-UM
1996 NOCH...
1997 Die Insel schwimmt
1997 In dunkeln Träumen...
1997/98 GO-UN NIM
1998 sowon...borira
1999 BI-YU
1999/2000 IO
2000 Roaring Hooves
2000/01 Dorthin, wo der Himmel endet
2002 Louise Labé
2002 Silbersaiten
2003 Moira
2004/05 Wundgeträumt
2005 Hin-Nun II / White Snow
2006 Mondschatten (Moon Shadow)
2007 Bleibt in mir und ich in euch
2007 Das Universum atmet, es wächst und schwindet
2007 Gi-da-ryu-ra / Warte nur
2007 In luce ambulemus
2007 Qui-Han-Nim / Edler Mann
2007 Vide Domine, vide afflictionem nostram
2008 Fanfare
2008 I thirst
2009 Attende, Domine, miserecordiam tuam
2009 Den Müttern
2009 Silbersaiten III
2009 Unterm Sternenlicht
2010 Im Lichte wollen wir wandeln
2010 Silbersaiten II
2010 Silbersaiten
2010/2011 Hohes und tiefes Licht

External links
Official site including list of works, biographical information etc.
Publisher's website: Younghi Pagh-Paan at Ricordi Berlin

References

1945 births
Living people
20th-century classical composers
South Korean music educators
People from North Chungcheong Province
Seoul National University alumni
South Korean classical composers
South Korean expatriates in Germany
Women classical composers
Recipients of the Order of Civil Merit (Korea)
Members of the Academy of Arts, Berlin
International Rostrum of Composers prize-winners
Women music educators
20th-century women composers